The Village of Stepanchikovo and Its Inhabitants: From the Notes of an Unknown (Selo Stepanchikovo i ego obitateli. Iz zapisok neizvestnogo), also known as The Friend of the Family, is a novel written by Fyodor Dostoevsky and first published in 1859.

Summary
Sergey Alexandrovich, the narrator, is summoned from St. Petersburg to the estate of his uncle, Colonel Yegor Ilyich Rostanev, and finds that a middle-aged charlatan named Foma Fomich Opiskin has swindled the nobles around him into believing that he is virtuous despite behavior that is passive-aggressive, selfish, and spiteful. Foma obliges the servants to learn French, and gets furious when they are caught dancing the kamarinskaya.

Uncle Yegor asks Sergey to marry the poor young girl Nastenka. It turns out Uncle Yegor is in love with her himself, but Foma wants him to marry the wealthy Tatyana Ivanova instead. Tatyana has several other suitors, including Mizinchikov, who confides in Sergey about his plans to elope with her.

The next morning Tatyana has eloped, not with Mizinchikov but with Obnoskin, who acted under the influence of his mother. After a pursuit Tatyana returns voluntarily. At Stepanchikovo Foma Fomich is furious because Uncle Yegor has been caught red-handed during an assignation in the garden with Nastenka. Foma leaves, but falls into a ditch. The inhabitants beg him to come back. A general reconciliation follows after Foma, manipulating as ever, gives his blessing to a marriage between Uncle Yegor and Nastenka.

Characters
 Foma Fomich Opiskin: fifty years old
 Sergey Alexandrovich - Seryozha: the narrator, nephew of the colonel, twenty-two years old
 Yegor Ilyich Rostanev: the colonel, forty years old, retired
 Ilyusha: Rostanev's son, eight years old
 Sasha or Sashenka: Rostanev's daughter, fifteen years old
 Nastasya Yevgrafovna - Nastenka: the children's governess
 Yevgraf Larionych Yezhevikin: a serf, Nastenka's father
 Krakhotkin the General's lady: Rostanev's mother
 Miss Perepelitsyna: confidante of the General's lady
 Praskovya Ilyinichna: Rostanev's sister
 Stepan Alekseyich Bakhcheyev: Rostanev's friend
 Ivan Ivanych Mizinchikov: Rostanev's distant cousin, twenty-eight years old
 Pavel Semyonych Obnoskin: a guest of Rostanev's, twenty-five years old
 Anfisa Petrovna: Obnoskin's mother, fifty years old
 Tatyana Ivanovna: an old maid, thirty-five years old
 Korovkin: Rostanev's friend
 Gavrila Ignatych: a valet
 Grigory Vidoplyasov: a valet
 Falaley: a house-boy, sixteen years old

Background
Foma Opiskin was based on Nikolai Gogol in his last years. Foma's speeches are parodies of Gogol's Selected Passages from Correspondence with Friends, Opiskin's mannerisms, appearance and even personality are also based on Gogol.
 
The story has the structure of a comedy; it was originally intended as a play.

Dostoevsky wrote this novel for Mikhail Katkov, main editor of The Russian Messenger. In a letter to his brother Mikhail, Dostoevsky wrote: "The long story that I am writing for Katkov displeases me very much and goes against the grain. But I have already written a great deal, it's impossible to throw it away in order to begin another, and I have to pay back a debt." The novel was ultimately published in Krayevsky's National Annals.

Literary significance

References

External links
Full text of The Village of Stepanchikovo in the original Russian
The Village of Stepanchikovo, review at The Lectern, February 12, 2009

1859 Russian novels
Novels by Fyodor Dostoevsky
Works originally published in Otechestvennye Zapiski
Russian satirical novels